Khamis Al-Owairan Al-Dossari (8 September 1973 – 7 January 2020) was a Saudi Arabian footballer. He played most of his career for Al-Hilal and Al Ittihad.

Al-Owairan played for the Saudi Arabia national football team and was a participant at the 1998 and 2002 FIFA World Cup as well as the 1996 Summer Olympics.

See also
 List of men's footballers with 100 or more international caps

References

External links

1973 births
2020 deaths
Deaths from brain tumor
Sportspeople from Riyadh
Saudi Arabian footballers
Saudi Arabia international footballers
1996 AFC Asian Cup players
1997 FIFA Confederations Cup players
1998 FIFA World Cup players
Place of death missing
2002 FIFA World Cup players
2004 AFC Asian Cup players
AFC Asian Cup-winning players
Ittihad FC players
Footballers at the 1996 Summer Olympics
Olympic footballers of Saudi Arabia
Al Hilal SFC players
Association football midfielders
Saudi Professional League players
FIFA Century Club
Footballers at the 1994 Asian Games
Asian Games competitors for Saudi Arabia
20th-century Saudi Arabian people
21st-century Saudi Arabian people